The New Zealand women's national cricket team toured India from 28 June to 15 July playing a series of five One Day Internationals (ODIs) and three Twenty20 Internationals (T20Is). All the tour matches (five ODIs, three T20I and one tour match against India A Women) were hosted at the M. Chinnaswamy Stadium in Bangalore. Initially Alur (North Bangalore) was selected to host the three T20I, but eventually the matches were moved to M Chinnaswamy Stadium. The first three of five ODIs matches were part of the 2014–16 ICC Women's Championship. The hosts won the ODI series by 3-2, whereas the tourists secured a victory in T20I series by 2-1.

Squads

Tour matches

List A:India A Women vs New Zealand Women

ODI Series

1st ODI

2nd ODI

3rd ODI

4th ODI

5th ODI

T20I series

1st T20I

2nd T20I

3rd T20I

References

External links
New Zealand Women Tour of India 2015 page on Cricinfo
ICC Women's Championship page on Cricinfo

2014–16 ICC Women's Championship
International cricket competitions in 2015
New Zealand 2015-16
India 2015-16
2015–16 Indian women's cricket
2014–15 Indian women's cricket
2015 in New Zealand cricket
2015 in women's cricket